Powhatan Courthouse Historic District is a county courthouse complex and national historic district located at Powhatan, Powhatan County, Virginia.  The district includes four contributing buildings.  The Powhatan County Court House was built in 1848–1849, and is a stuccoed temple-form Greek Revival style building measuring approximately 40 feet by 54 feet. There is strong circumstantial evidence that it is the work of Alexander Jackson Davis. Associated with the courthouse are the contributing former clerk's office, a "T"-shaped brick structure dated to the late-18th century; the early-19th century former jail; and Scott's or Powhatan Tavern, a large late-18th century tavern, a 2 1/2-story, brick structure.

It was listed on the National Register of Historic Places in 1970.

References

Courthouses on the National Register of Historic Places in Virginia
County courthouses in Virginia
Historic districts on the National Register of Historic Places in Virginia
Buildings and structures in Powhatan County, Virginia
National Register of Historic Places in Powhatan County, Virginia
Government buildings completed in 1849
Greek Revival architecture in Virginia
Alexander Jackson Davis buildings
1849 establishments in Virginia